Edward Trumbull (1884  1968) was an American painter known primarily as a muralist.

Biography
Edward Trumbull was born in Michigan and raised in Stonington, Connecticut. He studied at the Art Students League in New York City.
 He next worked in London, England as an assistant to the Welsh artist Frank Brangwyn.

He was introduced to the condiment mogul Henry J. Heinz by the painter Sir Alfred East. Heinz then hired him to create the murals in Heinz administration building in Pittsburgh. In 1915 Trumbull executed two murals for the Pennsylvania Building at the Panama-Pacific Exposition in San Francisco designed by architect Henry Hornbostel, “William Penn’s Treaty with the Indians” and “The Steel Industries of Pittsburgh”.Trumbull resided in Pittsburgh between 1912 and 1920.

Trumbull then moved to New York City. In Manhattan Trumbull created the art-deco terra cotta façade bas relief on the Chanin Building, the "Graybar passage mural" in Grand Central Terminal (1927) rendered on one of the seven vaults comprising the passage's ceiling and depicting transportation, and the mural "Transport and Human Endeavor" on the celing of the lobby of the Chrysler Building (1930), the largest ever painting at the time,

Personal life and bigamy scandal 
In 1911, Trumbull was engaged to the painter Katherine Sophie Dreier, when they both lived in London. In August 1911, he married Drier at her home at 6 Montague Terrace in Brooklyn. Shortly after the marriage ceremony, Dreier found out that he was already married as Trumbull's existing betrothal had not come to a legal conclusion. Trumbull and Dreier's marriage was thus annulled.

References

19th-century American painters
1968 deaths
1884 births
20th-century American painters